The Women's 4 × 200 m Freestyle Relay at the 2007 World Aquatics Championships took place on 29 March 2007 at the Rod Laver Arena in Melbourne, Australia. The top-12 finishers from this race qualified for the event at the 2008 Olympics. 25 teams were entered in the event; all swam.

The existing records when the event started were:
World Record (WR):  7:50.82, Germany (Dallmann, Samulski, Steffen, Liebs), 3 August 2006 in Budapest, Hungary.
Championship Record (CR): 7:53.70, USA (Coughlin, Hoff, Myers, Sandeno), Montreal 2005 (Jul.28.2005)

Results

Finals

Preliminaries

See also
Swimming at the 2005 World Aquatics Championships – Women's 4 × 200 metre freestyle relay
Swimming at the 2008 Summer Olympics – Women's 4 × 200 metre freestyle relay
Swimming at the 2009 World Aquatics Championships – Women's 4 × 200 metre freestyle relay

References

Women's 4x200m Freestyle Relay Preliminary results from the 2007 World Championships. Published by OmegaTiming.com (official timer of the '07 Worlds); Retrieved 2009-07-11.
Women's 4x200m Freestyle Relay Final results from the 2007 World Championships. Published by OmegaTiming.com (official timer of the '07 Worlds); Retrieved 2009-07-11.

Swimming at the 2007 World Aquatics Championships
2007 in women's swimming